The Waikari River is a river in the Hawke's Bay region of New Zealand's North Island. It flows generally east from its source at the northern end of the Maungaharuru Range passing the settlement of Putorino to reach Hawke Bay 25 kilometres southwest of Wairoa. The name Waikari comes from the Maori word wai meaning "water" and kari meaning "dig".

History

In the 1931 earthquake a tsunami hit the river mouth, leaving fish up to 15 metres above the high tide level.

Flooding of the river during Cyclone Gabrielle destroyed the  State Highway 2 bridge over the river at Putorino.

See also
List of rivers of New Zealand

References

 New Zealand 1:50000 Topographic Map Series sheet BH39 – Putorino

Rivers of the Hawke's Bay Region
Rivers of New Zealand